Anthology was originally released as a triple-album greatest hits set by legendary Motown family unit, The Jackson 5, in 1976. It was the group's second greatest hits compilation, after Greatest Hits (1971). It was at this point that most of the Jackson brothers (with the glaring exception of Jermaine Jackson) had left the Motown label to join CBS Records. Motown president Berry Gordy once said that the Jackson 5 were "the last superstars to come off the Motown assembly line"; after the group left the label, Motown would not have another act to equal its success until Boyz II Men in the 1990s.

Later repackagings of Anthology have compiled it as a double compact disc set. The most recent re-release, issued by Motown in 2000 (the first time the release doesn't contain any hits from Michael or Jermaine), was repackaged in 2005 in North America as part of its Gold series, and in 2006 internationally as The Jackson 5 Story.

Critical reception 

Reviewing Anthology in Christgau's Record Guide: Rock Albums of the Seventies (1981), American music journalist Robert Christgau wrote:

Track listings

Key
(MJ) - Michael Jackson
(JJ) - Jermaine Jackson
(JaJ) - Jackie Jackson
(L) - Live version
(*) - Single version

Notes
1 - Edited down to 2:55.

Anthology 2000 version / Gold 2005 track listing

Charts

Certifications

References 

1976 greatest hits albums
Albums produced by Hal Davis
Motown compilation albums
The Jackson 5 compilation albums